CSI may refer to:

Places
 Chhatrapati Shivaji International Airport
 Cité des Sciences et de l'Industrie in Paris

Arts, entertainment, and media

CSI franchise
 CSI (franchise)
 CSI: Crime Scene Investigation, the original CSI television series, set in Las Vegas
 CSI: Miami, the first spin-off series starring David Caruso
 CSI: NY, the second spin-off series starring Gary Sinise
 CSI: Cyber, the third spin-off series starring Patricia Arquette
 CSI: Vegas, the fourth spin-off series and a sequel to the original
  CSI: Trilogy, the three-part television event featuring the casts of CSI: Crime Scene Investigation, CSI: Miami, and CSI: NY
  CSI (comics)
  CSI (novels)
  CSI (video games)
  CSI: The Experience, a traveling exhibition

Music
 Consorzio Suonatori Indipendenti, an Italian musical group
 CSI:Ambleside, a 2008 album by British band Half Man Half Biscuit

Other arts, entertainment, and media
 Carnaby Street (radio programme), Saturday morning Manx Radio broadcast featuring music and news from the 1960s 
 Coke Studio (India), an Indian musical television series

Enterprises and organizations
 Caldera Systems, Inc., a software company between 1998 and 2000 to develop Linux-based solutions
 Carroll Shelby International, a car manufacturer
 Catalyst Semiconductor Inc., Former semiconductor company acquired by ON Semiconductor
Centre for Social Impact, a network of research centres across four Australian universities 
 Centre for Social Investigation, an interdisciplinary research group in Oxford, England
 City Supermarket, Inc., a grocery chain based in Pangasinan, Philippines
 Coimisiún Sábháilteachta Iarnróid, the Railway Safety Commission of Ireland
 Computer Security Institute, a former professional association in the United States 
 Computer Society of India, a professional association 
 Computers and Structures, Inc., a structural engineering software company
 Construction Specifications Institute, a technical society in the United States 
 Crime Stoppers International

Paranormal
 Civilian Saucer Intelligence, an unidentified flying object research group
 Committee for Skeptical Inquiry, an organization for skeptical paranormal investigation

Post-nominals
 Companion of the Order of the Star of India (a.k.a. Companion of the Most Exalted Order of the Star of India), an award
 Companion Order of the Star of India, a class of the order of chivalry founded by Queen Victoria
 Cross of Solomon Islands, a class of the Order of the Solomon Islands

Religion
 Christian Schools International
 Christian Solidarity International
 Christian Surfers International
 Church of Scientology International
 Church of South India
 Church of South India Boys Higher Secondary School

Schools
 Canadian Securities Institute, a financial education company providing professional credentials and compliance courses
 Cité Scolaire Internationale de Grenoble, an international school in Grenoble, France
 Cité Scolaire Internationale de Lyon, an international school in Lyon, France
 Colegio San Ignacio de Loyola, a Jesuit prep-school in San Juan, Puerto Rico
 College of Southern Idaho, a community college in the United States
 College of Staten Island, part of The City University of New York in the United States

Sport
 Commission Sportive Internationale, a governing body for motor racing
 Concours de Saut International, a ranking system for show jumping
 CueSports International, a pool (pocket billiards) event promotion company and league organizer, affiliated with the Billiard Congress of America

Technology
 Camera Serial Interface, an MIPI Alliance protocol for cameras and mobile devices
 Cauchy–Schwarz inequality, a mathematical estimate for the scalar product
 Channel state information, a wireless communication term
 Coherence scanning interferometry, an areal surface topography technique related to 3D interference microscopy
 Commercial satellite imagery
 Common System Interface, a former name of the Intel QuickPath Interconnect, a computer bus
 Complex specified information, a concept related to intelligent design
 Control Sequence Introducer, a control character for initiating escape sequences
 Crystalline silicon (c-Si), used in solar cell technology
 Conditional symmetric instability, a form of convective instability in a fluid

Other uses
 Calcite Saturation Index, a water pollution indicator
 California Solar Initiative, a renewable energy program
 Chlorosulfonyl isocyanate
 Complex specified information (see specified complexity), an argument used against biological evolution by the Intelligent Design movement
 Container Security Initiative, a program of the U.S. Bureau of Customs and Border Protection
 Continual service improvement, the 5th lifecycle phase of the ITIL Service Management framework
 Crime scene investigator, a person who investigates crime scene evidence
 CSI 300 Index, a stock market index compiled by the China Securities Index Company
 CSI effect

See also
 Crime scene investigation (disambiguation)